Leah Thomas can refer to:

 Leah Thomas (cyclist), an American cyclist
 Leah Thomas (ecofeminist), an American ecofeminist activist

See also 
 Lia Thomas, an American swimmer